The 1980 Oklahoma Sooners football team represented the University of Oklahoma in the 1980 NCAA Division I-A football season. Oklahoma was a member of the Big Eight Conference and played its home games in Oklahoma Memorial Stadium. The team posted a 10–2 overall record and a 7–0 conference record to earn the conference title outright under head coach Barry Switzer who took the helm in 1973. This was Switzer's eighth conference title and fifth undefeated conference record in eight seasons.

The team was led by All-Americans Terry Crouch, and Louis Oubre, After winning the conference title outright, it earned a trip to the Orange Bowl for a rematch with Florida State. During the season, it faced four ranked opponent: No. 3 Texas, No. 6 North Carolina, No. 4 Nebraska and No. 2 Florida State. The last three of these opponents finished the season ranked. It endured two early season losses against Stanford and Texas in the Red River Shootout. The Sooners finished the season with eight consecutive wins.

David Overstreet led the team in rushing with 720 yards, J. C. Watts led the team in passing with 1037 yards, Bobby Grayson led the team in receiving with 389 yards, Watts led the team in scoring with 108 points, Mike Coats led the team with 126 tackles and Gary Lowell posted 4 interceptions. 
The team set the current school records of 82 points and 875 total yards against Colorado.

Schedule

Roster

Game summaries

Kentucky

at Nebraska

Oklahoma State

Awards and honors
All-American: Terry Crouch, and Louis Oubre,

Rankings

Postseason

NFL draft
The following players were drafted into the National Football League following the season.

References

External links
 1980 season at SoonerStats.com

Oklahoma
Oklahoma Sooners football seasons
Big Eight Conference football champion seasons
Orange Bowl champion seasons
Oklahoma Sooners football